Cockburn City Soccer Club  is an Australian soccer club currently playing in the National Premier Leagues Western Australia. They play their home games at Dalmatinac Park and train at Beale Park.

History
Cockburn City Soccer Club's origin goes back to 1929 when they were known as Spearwood Rovers, and after the 1964 season they amalgamated with Britannia (who had renamed a year earlier from Fremantle City) to become Cockburn United.  A few months earlier, some of the Spearwood Rovers club had joined forces with Balkans Dalmatinac, to create Fremantle Dalmatinac (who were renamed Spearwood Dalmatinac in 1974). The two clubs enjoyed success in the period after, with facilities close to each other at Dalmatinac Park and Beale Park. The clubs reunited in 1998 under the negotiations of Angelko Petkovich and John Mijacika and became Cockburn City Soccer Club. The facilities at both parks are still used by the club's Junior and Senior teams.

Men's team

Current squad

Current coaching staff
 First-team coach: Mirko Jelicic
 Assistant coach: Dale Wingell 
 Goalkeeping coaches: Christopher Adams, Jason Petkovic

Honours (League Positions)

(as Spearwood/Fremantle Dalmatinac)                                                                  
1964:  1st – Semi-Pro Second Division
1974:  1st – Semi-Pro First Division
1979:  1st – Semi-Pro Premier League
1982:  1st – Semi-Pro Premier League
1986:  1st – Semi-Pro Premier League

(as Cockburn United/Spearwood Rovers)
1963:  1st – Semi-Pro First Division
1994:  1st – Semi-Pro Second Division

(as Cockburn City)
2012:  1st – State League Division 1

Ref:

Notable past players
List includes players from Cockburn youth or senior teams that have gone on to represent the Australian national team.

 Robert Zabica
 Jason Petkovic
 David Tarka
 Scott Miller

Women's team
The Cockburn city women's team last played in the 2014 Women's State League Premier Division in the 2014 season.

References

External links
Official Website 

National Premier Leagues clubs
Football West State League teams
Association football clubs established in 1929
1929 establishments in Australia